James Johnstone Keswick (1845–1914) was a Scottish businessman in China and Hong Kong. He was the tai-pan of the Jardine Matheson & Co.

Biography
He was the son of the Thomas Keswick, and younger brother of William Keswick, who was the founder of the Keswick family. He arrived in the Far East in 1870 and remained there for 26 years. He became a partner of the Messrs Jardine, Matheson & co. and tai-pan of the firm from the 1890s. He founded Hongkong Land together with his close associate Sir Paul Chater. This was a development company established in 1889 which remained closely associated with Jardine Matheson. Chater and J. J. Keswick became permanent joint managing directors of the new company.

He was also appointed as unofficial member of the Legislative Council and Executive Council of Hong Kong, chairman of the Hongkong and Shanghai Banking Corporation and Hong Kong Fire. He was the chairman of the Hong Kong General Chamber of Commerce in five terms between 1890 and 1900.

He had been resident in Japan, Shanghai, and Hong Kong. During his residence in China he was one of the best known figures in the foreign community, in which was nicknamed "James the bloody polite".

He married Marion "Minnie" Parkes, who was the daughter of Harry Smith Parkes, former British minister in Tokyo and Peking.

He died at an hotel at Bath, Somerset, at the age of 68, in 1914.

See also
 List of Executive Council of Hong Kong unofficial members 1896–1941

References

1845 births
1915 deaths
Hong Kong businesspeople
Hong Kong chief executives
Hong Kong people of Scottish descent
Scottish expatriates in Hong Kong
Scottish expatriates in China
Scottish expatriates in Japan
Members of the Executive Council of Hong Kong
Members of the Legislative Council of Hong Kong
Chairmen of the Shanghai Municipal Council
Jardine Matheson Group
Chairmen of HSBC
Hongkong Land
James Johnstone
19th-century Scottish businesspeople